Lama (/ ˈlɛmə/ LEM-ah; Arabic: لمى ,لما, lamá) is a common Arabic female given first name that has its roots in Arabic poetry. The specific definition of it is debated and the word itself is not a synonym to any other Arabic world. 

One definition is "lips that are dark like the color of a sunset", has been used in Arabic poetry to refer to the lips of the beloved. 

There are numerous notable Arab women with the name Lama, including, but not limited to:

Lama Abu-Odeh (born 1962), Jordanian legal scholar
Lama Hasan (born 1973), British journalist
Lama Hattab (born 1980), Jordanian athlete
Lama Salam (born 1961), Lebanese politician Tammam Salam's wife
 Lama bint Turki Al Saud, Saudi royal

See also
Lama (disambiguation)
Arabic feminine given names